Marco Arturo Ramírez (born 25 October 1990), known as Marco, is a Mexican footballer who plays for Puebla F.C. in Mexico, mainly as a left winger. He came up through Lobos de la BUAP Youth system. Later was transferred to Puebla FC Reserves. He was recently called to take part in the 2011 Apertura Tournament.

References

External links

Player Profile Femexfut

1990 births
Living people
Mexican footballers
Association football wingers
Club Puebla players